Kuşadası Clock Tower is a clock tower located in Kuşadası district of Aydın province. The tower, built in 1996, was designed with a four-storey square plan and was completed with a circular clock dial and a pyramidal roof.

References 

Buildings and structures in Aydın Province
Clock towers in Turkey
Towers completed in 1996
1996 establishments in Turkey
Kuşadası District